Nointot is a commune in the Seine-Maritime department in the Normandy region in northern France.

Geography
The A29 autoroute passes through the northern part of the commune. The village is served by SNCF, having a TER railway station here.

Population

Places of interest
 Two chateaux.
 The church of St. Sauveur, dating from the eighteenth century.
 A railway viaduct built in 1844: 524m in length with 49 arches up to 35m high.

See also
Communes of the Seine-Maritime department

References

Communes of Seine-Maritime